The Polish-language surname Wojtkiewicz may refer to:

Aleksander Wojtkiewicz (1963–2006), Polish chess grandmaster
Dennis Wojtkiewicz (born 1956), American painter
Michał Wojtkiewicz (born 1946), American politician
Witold Wojtkiewicz (1879–1909), Polish painter

See also
4475 Voitkevich 
Wójtowicz

Polish-language surnames